This is a list of concerts and tours by South Korean–Japanese girl group Iz*One. The group held their first standalone concert, Iz*One "Color*Iz" Show-Con, on October 29, 2018, in conjunction with the release of their debut Korean extended play Color*Iz. Their second standalone concert, Iz*One Japan Debut Showcase, was held on January 20, 2019, in support of their debut Japanese single "Suki to Iwasetai". From June 7, 2019, to September 25, 2019, Iz*One headlined their only Asia tour, Iz*One 1st Concert "Eyes On Me", with 11 shows in 5 countries, drawing a total audience of 81,000. On September 13, 2020, the group held their first online concert, "Oneiric Theater", as in-person concerts were not possible due to the COVID-19 pandemic. Their final concert, "One, the Story", also in virtual format, was broadcast On March 13 and 14, 2021, ahead of the group's disbandment.

Concert tours

Iz*One 1st Concert "Eyes On Me"

In May 2019, Iz*One was announced to be headlining their first Asia tour titled "Eyes on Me". After tickets for the first two initial dates–June 8 and 9–were sold out, Off the Record added an additional concert date on June 7. The tour began on June 7, 2019, at the Jamsil Indoor Stadium in Seoul, South Korea, and concluded on September 25, 2019, at the Saitama Super Arena in Saitama, Japan. During the tour, Iz*One performed two new songs, "Ayayaya" and "So Curious", as sub-units. Overall, the group visited eight cities in five territories, with 81,000 attendance in total. The tour was documented in a documentary film titled Eyes on Me: The Movie. Originally scheduled for November 2019, the film's release was postponed indefinitely after Iz*One entered a hiatus due to the Mnet vote manipulation investigation. It was released on June 10, 2020.

Set list
"Hey. Bae. Like It."
"O' My!"
"We Together"
"Nekoni Naritai" 
"Gokigen Sayonara" 
"Airplane"
"Yume wo Miteiru Aida"
"Really Like You"
"Colors"
"To Reach You"
"Rollin' Rollin'"
"I Am"
"Nekkoya (Pick Me)"
"So Curious" (Exclusive Track)
"Ayayaya" (Exclusive Track)
"Suki to Iwasetai"
"Suki ni Nacchau Darō?"
"Highlight"
"La Vie en Rose"
"Rumor"
"Violeta"
"Memory"
"Up"

Tour dates

Standalone concerts

Iz*One "Color*Iz" Show-Con

On October 29, 2018, Iz*One held their first concert titled "Iz*One "Color*Iz" Show-Con" in conjunction with the release of their debut EP at the Olympic Hall in Seoul, South Korea. Tickets for the concert were sold out within a minute of being on sale.

Set list 
"We Together"
"You Are in Love, Right?"
"Memory"
"O' My!"
"1000%"
"Rumor"
"La Vie en Rose"
"Nekkoya (Pick Me)"

Iz*One Japan Debut Showcase

On January 20, 2019, Iz*One held a concert titled "Iz*One Japan Debut Showcase" at the Tokyo Dome City Hall to promote their debut in Japan and the release of their debut Japanese single "Suki to Iwasetai".

Set list 
"La Vie en Rose"
"We Together"
"Suki ni Nacchau Darō?"
"Neko ni Naritai"	
"I Am"
"Gokigen Sayonara" 	
"See You Again"
"Dance wo Omoidasu Made"	
"Yume wo Miteiru Aida" 
"Suki to Iwasetai"
"O' My!"
"Nekkoya (Pick Me)"

Online concerts

Iz*One Online Concert "Oneiric Theater"

In August 2020, Iz*One announced an upcoming concert titled "Oneiric Theater" which was to be held virtually due to restrictions related to the COVID-19 pandemic. The concert was broadcast on September 13, 2020.

Set list 
"Welcome"
"Secret Story of the Swan"
"Merry-Go-Round"
"Rococo"
"O' My!"
"Pretty"
"You & I"
"Memory"
"Someday"
"Catallena" 
"Coming of Age Ceremony" 
"Monster" 
"Gangsta 
"La Vie en Rose"
"Violeta"
"Fiesta"
"Up"
"Airplane" 
"Spaceship"
"Destiny"
"Yume wo Miteiru Aida"
"With*One"

Iz*One Online Concert "One, the Story"

On February 11, 2021, Iz*One announced their second and final online concert titled "One, the Story". The concert was broadcast on March 13 and 14.

Set list 
"La Vie en Rose"
"Mise-en-Scène"
"Colors"
"O' My!"
"Really Like You"
"Hey. Bae. Like it."
"Highlight"
"Violeta"
"Señorita" 
"All Hands on Deck 
"Señorita" 
"Full Moon" 
"Adrenaline" 
"Sunny" 
"Roly-Poly" 
"Open Your Eyes"
"Up"
"Airplane"
"Spaceship"
"Fiesta"
"Rococo"
"Merry-Go-Round"
"Secret Story of the Swan"
"Panorama"
"Sequence"	
"With*One"
"Lesson"
"Slow Journey"

References

Concert Tours
Lists of concert tours
Lists of concert tours of South Korean artists